The 2013 Men's World Team Squash Championships is the men's edition of the 2013 World Team Squash Championships, which serves as the world team championship for squash players. The event was held in Mulhouse, France, from June 9 to June 15, 2013. The tournament is organized by the World Squash Federation and the French Squash Federation. The England team won its fifth World Team Championships beating the Egyptian team in the final.

Participating teams
A total of 31 teams competed from all the five confederations: Africa, America, Asia, Europe and Oceania. For Botswana and Poland, it was their first participation at a world team championship.

Seeds

Squads

  Egypt
 Ramy Ashour
 Karim Darwish
 Omar Mosaad
 Tarek Momen

  Scotland
 Alan Clyne
 Greg Lobban
 Douglas Kempsell
 Chris Small

  Kuwait
 Abdullah Al Muzayen
 Ammar Altamimi
 Yousif Nizar Saleh
 Omar Al Jamaan

  Kenya
 Maina Kenneth Mwang
 Hartaj Bains
 Rajdeep Bains
 Joseph Ndungu

  England
 Nick Matthew
 James Willstrop
 Daryl Selby
 Adrian Grant

  Canada
 Shawn Delierre
 Dane Sharp
 Andrew Schnell
 David Letourneau

  Colombia
 Miguel Ángel Rodríguez
 Erick Daniel Herrera
 Bernardo Samper
 Andres Vargas

  Namibia
 Marco Becker
 Norbert Dorgeloh
 Andrew Forrest
 Daniel Gruff

  France
 Grégory Gaultier
 Thierry Lincou
 Mathieu Castagnet
 Grégoire Marche

  Pakistan
 Nasir Iqbal
 Farhan Zaman
 Farhan Mehboob
 Saqib Yousaf

  Netherlands
 Laurens Jan Anjema
 Sebastiaan Weenink
 Bart Ravelli
 Marc Ter Sluis

  Russia
 Valeri Litvinko
 Alexander Shilov
 Dmitri Grishanin
 Sergei Beljaev

  Australia
 Cameron Pilley
 David Palmer
 Ryan Cuskelly
 Matthew Karwalski

  Mexico
 Arturo Salazar
 Cesar Salazar
 Eric Gálvez
 Not Used

  Switzerland
 Nicolas Müller
 Reiko Peter
 Jonas Daehler
 Patrick Miescher

  Malaysia
 Ong Beng Hee
 Mohd Nafiizwan Adnan
 Muhd Asyraf Azan
 Sanjay Singh

  New Zealand
 Campbell Grayson
 Martin Knight
 Evan Williams
 Paul Coll

  Botswana
 Alister Walker
 Lekgotla Mosope
 Jason Boyle
 Theo Pelonomi

  Poland
 Wojtek Nowisz
 Marcin Karwowski
 Przemyslaw Atras
 Lukasz Stachowski

  Germany
 Simon Rösner
 Raphael Kandra
 Jens Schoor
 Andre Haschker

  United States
 Chris Gordon
 Julian Illingworth
 Gilly Lane
 Dylan Murray

  Ireland
 Arthur Gaskin
 Derek Ryan
 Brian O'Brion
 Steve Richardson

  Czech Republic
 Ondrej Ertl
 Petr Martin
 Ondrej Uherka
 Daniel Mekbib

  South Africa
 Steve Coppinger
 Shaun Le Roux
 Clinton Leeuw
 Rodney Durbach

  Hong Kong
 Max Lee
 Leo Au
 Tsz Fung Yip
 Cheuk Yan Tang

  Austria
 Aqeel Rehman
 Jakob Dirnberger
 Andreas Freudensprung
 Marcus Greslehner

  Japan
 Shinnosuke Tsukue
 Yuta Fukui
 Ryosei Kobayashi
 Tomotaka Endo

  India
 Saurav Ghosal
 Harinder Pal Sandhu
 Ramit Tandon
 Mahesh Mangaonkar

  Finland
 Olli Tuominen
 Henrik Mustonen
 Matias Tuomi
 Mika Monto

  Argentina
 Hernan D'Arcangelo
 Rodrigo Pezzota
 Juan Pablo Roude
 Leandro Romiglio

  Venezuela
 Gabriel Teran
 Miguel Mendez
 Miguel Vallennilla
 Ricardo Teran

Group stage

Pool A 

June 9, 2013

June 10, 2013

June 11, 2013

Pool B 

June 9, 2013

June 10, 2013

June 11, 2013

Pool C 

June 9, 2013

June 10, 2013

June 11, 2013

Pool D 

June 9, 2013

June 10, 2013

June 11, 2013

Pool E 

June 9, 2013

June 10, 2013

June 11, 2013

Pool F 

June 9, 2013

June 10, 2013

June 11, 2013

Pool G 

June 9, 2013

June 10, 2013

June 11, 2013

Pool H 

June 9, 2013

June 10, 2013

June 11, 2013

Finals

Draw

Results

Quarterfinals

Semifinals

Final

Post-tournament team ranking

External links 
Men's World Team Squash Championships 2013 Official Website
Men's World Team Squash Championships 2013 SquashSite Website

See also 
World Team Squash Championships
World Squash Federation
2013 Men's World Open Squash Championship

References

Squash tournaments in France
International sports competitions hosted by France
Squash
W
World Squash Championships
Sport in Mulhouse